UniCredit S.p.A. is an international banking group headquartered in Milan. It is Italy's only systemically important bank (according to the list provided by the Financial Stability Board in 2022) and the world's 34th largest by assets. It was formed through the merger of Credito Italiano and Unicredito in 1998 but has a corporate identity stretching back to its first foundation in 1870 as Banca di Genova. UniCredit is listed on the Milan and Frankfurt stock exchanges, is a constituent stock of the Euro Stoxx 50 index of leading shares.

With corporate & investment banking, commercial banking and wealth management operations, Unicredit is a pan-European bank with a strong presence in Western, Central and Eastern Europe. Through its European banking network, it provides access to market-leading products and services in 13 core markets: Italy, Germany as HypoVereinsbank, Austria as Bank Austria and eleven Central and Eastern European countries.

History

Founding through mergers and growth (1998–2006) 
UniCredit Group was the outcome of the 1998 merger of several Italian banking groups, which the majority one were Unicredito (banks from Turin, Verona and Treviso) and Credito Italiano (consists of Rolo Banca, Banca Popolare di Rieti), hence the name Unicredito Italiano. Credito Italiano issued about 38.46% new shares to the owners of Unicredito, and renamed itself to Unicredito Italiano. Other banks such as Banca dell'Umbria, Cassa di Risparmio di Carpi, Cassa di Risparmio di Trento e Rovereto (Caritro), Cassa di Risparmio di Trieste also joined the group in 1998–2000. A new subsidiary was also created in December 1999 which was named after the original Credito Italiano.

In 1999, UniCredito Italiano, as it was then known, began its expansion in Eastern Europe with the acquisition of Polish company Bank Pekao. On 30 June 2002, UniCredit started its S3 project which merged 7 of their bank network: Rolo Banca, Banca CRT, Cariverona Banca, Cassamarca, Cassa di Risparmio di Trento e Rovereto and Cassa di Risparmio di Trieste into Credito Italiano, and Credito Italiano was renamed into UniCredit Banca. UniCredit Private Banking and UniCredit Banca d'Impresa was spin off from it in 2003.

In 2005, UniCredit merged with the German group HypoVereinsbank (HVB), which is itself formed in 1998 by the combination of two Bavarian banks: Bayerische Vereinsbank and Bayerische Hypotheken-und Wechsel-Bank.
Integration with the HVB Group was reinforced by the merger with Bank Austria Creditanstalt in the year 2000 and enabled further growth for the UniCredit Group.
Additionally, Bank Austria Creditanstalt was a major shareholder in Bank Medici AG. Bank Medici was Thema Fund's investment manager.  In return for finding investors, Bank Medici collected fees of 4.6 million euros from Thema International Fund in 2007.  Following the news that Bank Medici had invested US$2 billion with Bernard Madoff, officials in Vienna appointed a supervisor to run the private bank, raising questions about control of the sprawling group.

On 30 June 2005 Banca dell'Umbria and Cassa di Risparmio di Carpi were absorbed into the parent company.

In 2006 the securities services business of UniCredit (2S Banca, now Société Générale Security Services S.p.A.) was sold to Société Générale for €579.3 million.

In 2006, minority interests in the savings banks of Bra (31.021%), Fossano (23.077%), Saluzzo (31.019%) and Savigliano (31.006%) were sold for about €149 million to Banca Popolare dell'Emilia Romagna.

Acquisition of Capitalia and recent history (2007–2017) 
In 2007, in combination with the Capitalia Group, the fourth-largest Italian banking group (by total assets in 2006; Sanpaolo IMI and Banca Intesa were counted as one entity as the banks also merged in 2007); UniCredit Group consolidated and strengthened its position, but added considerably to its overhead costs. The registered office of the bank was also relocated from Genoa (inherited from Credito Italiano) to 17 via Minghetti, Rome.

In the same year, two more acquisitions were carried out: ATF Bank, which ranks fifth out of domestic banks in Kazakhstan with 154 branches, and Ukrsotsbank, a universal bank in Ukraine. With these two banks , the Group extended its operations in this area to 19 countries (including Central Asia). However, in November 2012, Kazakh government sources declared UniCredit is in talks with Kazakh investors over the sale of a controlling stake in ATF Bank.

In 2010, UniCredit S.p.A. absorbed its Italian banking subsidiaries: UniCredit Banca, Banca di Roma and Banco di Sicilia.

In 2013 UniCredit Finance reported that they would no longer provide banking services in Latvia.

On March 14, 2014 UniCredit announced that it expected to cut around 8,500 jobs in the future, together with the announcement of a $15 billion loss in the 4th quarter of 2013 due to extensive cash-reserving for bad loans and writing down goodwill from acquisitions. UniCredit is one of the 6 European banks which are currently most exposed to potential problems in the emerging markets.

In April 2015 UniCredit and Banco Santander reached a preliminary agreement to merge their asset-management businesses in a transaction valuing the combined entity at about €5.4 billion. The accord created a holding company called Pioneer Investments that is 50 percent owned by UniCredit and 50 percent held by the U.S. buyout firms Warburg Pincus LLC and General Atlantic LLC. The holding firm owns Pioneer's U.S. business and controls combined operations of UniCredit's Pioneer, excluding its U.S. activities, and Santander Asset Management. The two lenders hold each one-third of the new combined business, while Warburg Pincus and General Atlantic owns the rest. However, the deal was terminated on 27 July 2016. Nevertheless, Pioneer was sold in December 2016 to Amundi for  €3.545 billion. UniCredit also received an extraordinary dividend of €315 million from Pioneer.

From June 2015 to January 2017 UniCredit sold its NPLs that was doubtful to collect (sofferenze) to various investors, namely PRA Group Europe (€625 million gross), a fund managed by Cerberus Capital Management (€100 million gross), a US fund (€150 million gross), AnaCap Financial Partners (€420 million gross), Fortress Investment Group and PIMCO (€17.7 billion gross; UniCredit retained a minority stake in the securitization SPV), B2 Kapital (€110 million in gross from Slovenian subsidiary) and B2Holding (€93 million from UniCredit Bulbank). In October 2015, UniCredit also sold UniCredit Credit Management Bank (now doBank), the subsidiary that specialized in managing NPLs to Fortress Investment Group and Prelios S.p.A. A portfolio of €2.4 billion (in gross book value) NPLs was included in the deal. On a year to year basis, the net value of sofferenze had increased from €19.701 billion on 31 December 2014 to €19.924 billion on 31 December 2015 (or from €52.143 billion to €51.089 billion in gross).

In December 2016 UniCredit sold Polish bank Bank Pekao. UniCredit had already sold part of the stake in FinecoBank in mid 2016, as well as sold Ukrainian bank Ukrsotsbank to Alfa Group in January 2016. In December 2016, the card business in Italy, Germany and Austria was sold to SIA for €500 million.

On 13 December 2016, despite the annual European Central Bank (ECB) Supervisory Review and Evaluation Process (SREP) lowed the CET1 ratio (transitional basis) requirement of UniCredit from 9.75% to 8.75%, the bank announced a massive €13 billion recapitalization of the bank, as well as €8.1 billion loan loss provisions and net restructuring charges of €1.7 billion in the fourth quarter of 2016. In the 2016 European Union bank stress test announced on 29 July, UniCredit's CET1 ratio (fully loaded basis) was predicted at 7.10% in the adverse scenario on 31 December 2018, which was the second last among the big 5 Italian banks that participated in the stress test (the last was Banca Monte dei Paschi di Siena). Based on the 2016 SREP, UniCredit Group has required a fully load basis CET1 ratio of 10.5% from 1 January 2019 due to an increase in Capital Conservation Buffer and global systemically important bank buffer as required by CRR and CRD IV. Moreover, the pillar 2 guidance: the additional capital that ECB suggested the bank to keep, was remained confidential.

In January 2017 10 old ordinary shares were combined into 1 new ordinary share, as well as bearer savings share and registered savings share. On April 6, 2017, UniCredit issued its first bond in the United States in a decade. In mid-2017, a capital increase was completed as well as securitization and partial disposal of the NPLs of the bank. In December 2017, the savings share of the bank was converted to the ordinary share, as well as the removal of the 5% cap on voting rights for each entity.

Geography 
The company has its registered office and general management in Milan. The registered office was located in Rome from the date of the merger with Capitalia in 2007, and relocated back to Milan in 2017. The registered office was located in Genoa from 1999 to 2007. UniCredit's core markets are Italy, Germany, Austria, Bosnia and Herzegovina, Bulgaria, Croatia, Czech Republic, Hungary, Serbia, Slovakia, Slovenia, Romania, and Russia. In 2022, the group announced its intention to leave Russia and is trying to get permission from the Central Bank to sell the business.

UniCredit Corporate & Investment banking division serves 1,500 multinational corporates and key financial institutions and supports the group’s corporate banking units in delivering services to 600,000 corporate and public sector clients. Its International Network spreads over 16 countries worldwide and provides access to a network of 4,000 correspondent banking relationships, covering 175 countries. CIB international centers are present in New York City, London, Hong Kong, Singapore, Tokyo, Shanghai, Milan, Munich, Vienna, Budapest, Prague, Madrid, Beijing, Mumbai, Athens, Seoul, Zurich, Hanoi, Abu Dhabi.

Ownership 
UniCredit is a public company with a free float equal to 100% of the shares outstanding and there are no controlling shareholders or shareholders' agreements. The major shareholders (above 3%) collectively represent only 13% of the share capital (3 March 2021):

 BlackRock Group 5.075%
 Capital Research and Management Company 5.022%  - of which on behalf of EuroPacific Growth Fund 3.503%
 Norges Bank 3.011%
 ATIC Second International Investment Company LLC 2.016%
 Delfin S.a.r.l. 1.925%
 Fondazione Cassa di Risparmio di Ve-Vi-Bl e An 1.792%
 Fondazione Cassa di Risparmio di Torino 1.643%
 Allianz SE Group 1.255%

In addition, Fondazione Cariverona, Fondazione Cassa di Risparmio di Torino, the owners of the predecessors of UniCredit, as well as foreign sovereign wealth fund (and other government entity): Central Bank of Libya (and its subsidiary Libyan Foreign Bank) were the shareholders of UniCredit that owned more than 2% stake as at 31 December 2015. On 11 March 2011, Unicredit said in a press release that they froze the voting rights of the Libyan shareholders (Central Bank of Libya and Lia).

In addition to aforementioned banking foundations, Fondazione Roma and Fondazione Manodori, the former owners of Capitalia, also owned 0.479% stake and 0.278% stake respectively as at 31 December 2015. Carimonte Holding, the joint venture of Fondazione Carimodena and Fondazione del Monte di Bologna e Ravenna, owned 2.115% stake of UniCredit in 2014. Other known shareholders were Fondazione Cassamarca (0.23% at 31 December 2016) and Fondazione CRTrieste (0.282% at 31 December 2016), which were the former owner of UniCredit's predecessors.

Subsidiaries 

 Bank Austria (Austria)
 HypoVereinsbank (Germany)
 UniCredit Bank Czech Republic and Slovakia (Czech Republic, Slovakia)
 UniCredit Bank Ireland (Republic of Ireland)
 UniCredit Bank Hungary (Hungary)
 UniCredit Bank Romania (Romania)
 UniCredit Bank Russia (Russia)
 UniCredit Bank Serbia (Serbia)
 UniCredit Bank Slovenia (Slovenia)
 UniCredit Bulbank (Bulgaria)
 UniCredit Corporate & Investment Banking (Italy)
 UniCredit International Bank Luxembourg (Luxembourg)
 UniCredit Leasing (Italy)
 Zagrebačka banka (Croatia)
 UniCredit Zagrebačka banka Mostar , UniCredit Bank Banja Luka (Bosnia and Herzegovina)

Former Subsidiaries 
 YapıKredi (Turkey) (2006–2020)

Sponsorship 
UniCredit Group had sponsored tennis tournaments Czech Open, Vienna Open (by subsidiary Bank Austria), golf tournaments Ladies German Open (by subsidiary HypoVereinsbank and UniCredit) and Austrian Open (by subsidiary Bank Austria).

From 2009 to 2018, UniCredit was one of the main sponsors of UEFA Champions League.

See also 

 European Financial Services Roundtable
 List of bank mergers

References

External links 
 
Information about the UniCredit Bank (in English)

 
Financial services companies established in 1998
Banks established in 1998
Banks of Italy
Companies listed on the Borsa Italiana
Companies listed on the Frankfurt Stock Exchange
Companies listed on the Warsaw Stock Exchange
Systemically important financial institutions
Conglomerate companies of Italy
Italian brands
Multinational companies headquartered in Italy
Banks under direct supervision of the European Central Bank
Italian companies established in 1998